H. B. "Bebe" Lee (December 3, 1916 – March 31, 2013) was a college men's basketball coach and athletics administrator. He was the head coach of Utah State from 1945 to 1947, Colorado State from 1949 to 1950, and Colorado from 1950 to 1956. He coached his teams to a 91–119 record, winning two Big Seven Conference championships and made the 1955 Final Four in two NCAA tournament appearances.  He also served as Kansas State's athletic director from 1956 to 1968.  He played college basketball at Stanford.

Head coaching record

See also
 List of NCAA Division I Men's Final Four appearances by coach

References

1916 births
2013 deaths
American men's basketball coaches
American men's basketball players
Basketball coaches from Texas
Basketball players from Dallas
Colorado Buffaloes men's basketball coaches
Colorado State Rams men's basketball coaches
Kansas State Wildcats athletic directors
Sportspeople from Dallas
Stanford Cardinal men's basketball players
Utah State Aggies men's basketball coaches